Dyschirius opistholius is a species of ground beetle in the subfamily Scaritinae. It was described by Alluaud in 1936.

References

opistholius
Beetles described in 1936